The 2015 Men's Australian Hockey League was the 25th edition of the Australian Hockey League men's Field Hockey tournament. The tournament was held in the Northern Territory city of Darwin.

The QLD Blades won the tournament for the ninth time after defeating the WA Thundersticks 2–1 in the final. The Tassie Tigers won the bronze medal after defeating the VIC Vikings 4–3 in the third place match.

Competition format
The tournament is divided into two pools, Pool A and Pool B, consisting of four teams in a round robin format. Teams then progress into either Pool C, the medal round, or Pool D, the classification round. Teams carry over points from their previous match ups, and contest teams they are yet to play.

The top two teams in pools A and B progress to Pool C. The top two teams in Pool C continue to contest the Final, while the bottom two teams of Pool C play in the Third and Fourth place match.

The remaining bottom placing teams make up Pool D. The top two teams in Pool D play in the Fifth and Sixth place match, while the bottom two teams of Pool C play in the Seventh and Eighth place match.

Teams

  Canberra Lakers
  NSW Waratahs
  NT Stingers
  QLD Blades
  SA Hotshots
  Tassie Tigers
  VIC Vikings
  WA Thundersticks

Results

First round

Pool A

Pool B

Second round

Pool C (Medal Round)

Pool D (Classification Round)

Classification Games

Seventh and eighth place

Fifth and sixth place

Third and fourth place

Final

Awards

Statistics

Final standings

Goalscorers

References

2015
2015 in Australian field hockey